The Major League Baseball All-Star Game Most Valuable Player (MVP) Award is an annual Major League Baseball (MLB) award which is presented to the most outstanding player in each year's MLB All-Star Game. Awarded each season since 1962 (two games were held and an award was presented to each game winner in 1962), it was originally called the "Arch Ward Memorial Award" in honor of Arch Ward, the man who conceived of the All-Star Game in 1933. The award's name was changed to the "Commissioner's Trophy" in 1970 (two National League (NL) players were presented the award in 1975), but this name change was reversed in 1985 when the World Series Trophy was renamed the Commissioner's Trophy. Finally, the trophy was renamed the Ted Williams Most Valuable Player Award in 2002, in honor of former Boston Red Sox player Ted Williams, who had died earlier that year. No award was presented for the 2002 All-Star Game, which ended in a tie. Thus, the Anaheim Angels' Garret Anderson was the first recipient of the newly named Ted Williams Award in 2003. The All-Star Game Most Valuable Player also receives a Chevrolet vehicle, choosing between two cars. 

, NL players have won the award 27 times (including one award shared by two players), and American League (AL) players have won 30 times. Baltimore Orioles players have won the most awards for a single franchise (with six); players from the Cincinnati Reds, Los Angeles Dodgers and San Francisco Giants are tied for the most in the NL with five each. Five players have won the award twice: Willie Mays (1963, 1968), Steve Garvey (1974, 1978), Gary Carter (1981, 1984), Cal Ripken Jr. (1991, 2001), and Mike Trout (2014, 2015, becoming the only player to win the award in back-to-back years). The award has been shared by multiple players once; Bill Madlock and Jon Matlack shared the award in 1975. Two players have won the award for a game in which their league lost: Brooks Robinson in 1966 and Carl Yastrzemski in 1970. One pair of awardees were father and son (Ken Griffey Sr. and Ken Griffey Jr.), and another were brothers (Roberto Alomar and Sandy Alomar Jr.). Three players have won the MVP award at a game played in their home ballpark (Sandy Alomar Jr. in 1997, Pedro Martínez in 1999, and Shane Bieber in 2019). Derek Jeter is the only player to win the All-Star Game MVP and World Series MVP in the same season, doing so in 2000.

Giancarlo Stanton of the New York Yankees is the most recent MLB All-Star Game MVP, winning the award in 2022. Only six players have won the MVP award in their only All-Star Game appearance; LaMarr Hoyt, Bo Jackson, J. D. Drew, Melky Cabrera and Eric Hosmer. Only the Chicago White Sox, the Detroit Tigers, the Arizona Diamondbacks, the Colorado Rockies, the St. Louis Cardinals and the Washington Nationals (aside from their predecessor the Montreal Expos) have never had a player win the All-Star Game MVP award.

List of winners

See also 

World Series Most Valuable Player Award

Notes

References 
General

Specific

 
All-Star Game
Awards established in 1962